Jefferson Dias Sabino (born 4 November 1982, in Guarulhos, São Paulo) is a Brazilian triple jumper.

Career
He finished sixth at the 2005 Summer Universiade and fourth at the 2007 Pan American Games. He also competed at the 2006 World Indoor Championships and the 2007 World Championships without reaching the final.

His personal best jump is 17.28 metres, achieved in April 2008 in São Paulo.

Personal bests

Outdoor
Long jump: 7.67 m (wind: +1.7 m/s) –  São Paulo, 13 July 2004
Triple jump: 17.28 m (wind: +1.5 m/s) –  São Paulo, 25 April 2008

Competition record

References

External links

1982 births
Living people
People from Guarulhos
Brazilian male triple jumpers
Athletes (track and field) at the 2007 Pan American Games
Athletes (track and field) at the 2008 Summer Olympics
Athletes (track and field) at the 2011 Pan American Games
Athletes (track and field) at the 2015 Pan American Games
Olympic athletes of Brazil
Pan American Games bronze medalists for Brazil
Pan American Games medalists in athletics (track and field)
South American Games silver medalists for Brazil
South American Games medalists in athletics
Competitors at the 2014 South American Games
Medalists at the 2011 Pan American Games
Sportspeople from São Paulo (state)
21st-century Brazilian people